Turmantas is a town in the Zarasai district municipality, Lithuania. Located on the border with Latvia, it is a railway station on the Warsaw – Saint Petersburg railway. The village is known since 1798. It began growing after completion of the railway in 1862. As part of the Wilno Voivodeship, Turmantas was part of the Second Polish Republic between 1920 and 1939. During that time a wooden Catholic church was rebuilt, an Orthodox church for the Old Believers and a secondary school were built in the town. According to the 2011 census, it had 286 residents.

References

Towns in Lithuania
Towns in Utena County
Latvia–Lithuania border crossings
Novoalexandrovsky Uyezd
Wilno Voivodeship (1926–1939)
Zarasai District Municipality